Joseph Philip Lombardi (born June 6, 1971) is an American football coach and former player who is the offensive coordinator for the Denver Broncos of the National Football League (NFL). He previously served as the quarterbacks coach for the New Orleans Saints from 2016 to 2020 and was the offensive coordinator for the Detroit Lions from 2014 to 2015. Lombardi also previously served as an assistant coach for the Atlanta Falcons. He is the grandson of Pro Football Hall of Fame coach Vince Lombardi.

Early years
A 1994 graduate of the United States Air Force Academy, Lombardi played tight end for the Falcons under head coach Fisher DeBerry. He lettered three seasons and started as a senior; he also lettered a season in lacrosse. He served his four years on active duty in the Air Force, where he was a program manager on the F-22 program at Wright-Patterson Air Force Base in Dayton, Ohio.  In the last two years of his military time, he juggled his football and Air Force schedules as he was a volunteer coach at Dayton.

Coaching career

Early career
Prior to coaching in the NFL, Lombardi coached at the college level at Mercyhurst University (Formerly Mercyhurst College), Bucknell University, the Virginia Military Institute, and the University of Dayton. He coached for the New York/New Jersey Hitmen during the one year of the XFL.

Atlanta Falcons
In 2006, Lombardi was hired by the Atlanta Falcons as a defensive assistant under head coach Jim Mora.

New Orleans Saints
In 2007, Lombardi was hired by the New Orleans Saints as an offensive assistant and was promoted to quarterbacks coach in 2009 and the Saints would go on to win the Super Bowl that season. During his time in New Orleans, starting quarterback Drew Brees set numerous passing records, including passing for more than 5,000 yards five times (four times with Lombardi as quarterbacks coach), and setting the record (now surpassed) for the most passing yards in a single season (5,476 in 2011).

Detroit Lions
In 2014, Lombardi was hired by the Detroit Lions as their offensive coordinator under head coach Jim Caldwell. On October 26, 2015, he was fired by the Lions, along with several other members of the coaching staff, after a 1–6 start to the season.

New Orleans Saints (second stint)
In 2016, Lombardi was re-hired by the New Orleans Saints as their quarterbacks coach.

Los Angeles Chargers
On January 25, 2021, Lombardi was hired by the Los Angeles Chargers as their offensive coordinator under head coach Brandon Staley. He was fired on January 17, 2023 following an NFL Wild Card loss to the Jacksonville Jaguars where the Chargers lost despite a 27-point lead at one point during the 2nd quarter. He was strongly criticized during the season as causing a talented offense to regress and limiting the performance of quarterback Justin Herbert.

Denver Broncos
On February 25, 2023, the Denver Broncos announced the hiring of Lombardi as their offensive coordinator; reuniting him with the Broncos' new head coach Sean Payton.

Personal life
Lombardi is the grandson of Hall of Fame coach Vince Lombardi, who died the year before he was born, and son of Vince Lombardi, Jr. The youngest of four siblings, Lombardi also lived in Washington, New York, and Michigan. Lombardi played high school football at Seattle Prep, and graduated in 1990.

Lombardi and his wife Molly have seven children: four sons and three daughters. The family is Catholic.

References

External links
Denver Broncos bio

1971 births
Living people
Military personnel from Seattle
Players of American football from Seattle
Air Force Falcons football players
Air Force Falcons men's lacrosse players
Atlanta Falcons coaches
Mercyhurst Lakers football coaches
Bucknell Bison football coaches
Dayton Flyers football coaches
New Orleans Saints coaches
VMI Keydets football coaches
Detroit Lions coaches
San Francisco Demons coaches
American lacrosse players
Catholics from Washington (state)
Los Angeles Chargers coaches 
National Football League offensive coordinators